Haplochromis bicolor is a species of cichlid endemic to Lake Victoria where it prefers areas with hard substrates.  This species can reach a length of  SL.  This species has been placed in the genus Macropleurodus and may belong in that genus pending comprehensive revision of the genus Haplochromis.

References

bicolor
Fish described in 1906
Taxonomy articles created by Polbot